Emma Zilli (11 November 1864 – January 1901) was an Italian soprano, possibly best known for creating the role of Alice in Verdi's Falstaff in 1893.

Life
Zilli was born in Fagagna, Udine. She was trained as a pianist and began singing only after her marriage to the painter Giacomo Zilli, in 1882. She made her stage debut in 1887 at Ferrara as Paolina in Donizetti's Poliuto and in 1889 first sang at La Scala, Milan, as Camille in Hérold's Zampa.  In the same house she created the role of Alice Ford in Verdi's Falstaff (1893), and made her Covent Garden debut in the same role in the British premiere of the opera (1894).

Zilli was a powerful singing actress, though her voice had a prominent vibrato not to everyone's taste. Her favourite roles included Puccini's Manon Lescaut and Fidelia in his Edgar.

At the height of her career Zilli caught yellow fever while performing in South America and died in Havana, Cuba.

References

Further reading
 
 
 

1864 births
1901 deaths
Italian operatic sopranos
19th-century Italian women opera singers
People from Fagagna
Deaths from yellow fever
Infectious disease deaths in Cuba